Thomas McCabe may refer to:

 Thomas McCabe (United Irishmen) (1739–1820), Irish revolutionary
 Thomas B. McCabe (1893–1982), American businessman, former Federal Reserve Chairman
 Tom McCabe (footballer) (born 1933), New Zealand soccer player
 Tom McCabe (1954–2015), Scottish Labour Party politician
 Tommy McCabe (born 1998), American soccer player
 Tom McCabe (Rugby League player) (born 1965), Irish Irish amateur rugby union, rugby league and GAA footballer
 Tom McCabe (rugby league), Australian rugby league footballer in 1908–09 Kangaroo tour of Great Britain
 Thomas J. McCabe, Sr., developer of cyclomatic complexity, a metric in software engineering
 , former Bishop of the Roman Catholic Diocese of Wollongong (1951–1974)